Pematang Gadung is a village in the sub-district of Matan Hilir Selatan, Ketapang District, West Kalimantan, Indonesia. The village is located 30 km from the district capital and is the only village in the district that still has a natural peat-swamp forest. The forest has a depth range of 3–7 m and an area in excess of 14,000 hectares. It is rich in flora and fauna including orangutans, proboscis monkey, Maroon leaf monkey, silvery lutung, long-tailed macaques, sun bears, Horsfield's tarsier, Large flying fox, deer, crocodiles and more than 250 species of birds, and more than 30 species of orchid.

History 

The name of "Pematang Gadung" comes from the "Pematang" and "Gadung". Pematang means the sand embankment between the marsh and the Gadung is the name of the plant (Dioscorea hispida). People believe that the plants can repel crocodiles, so in the past it was planted in a neighborhood that is close to the river. With the goal is not crocodile approaching the township.

Economy

Education 
There are 1 kindergarten, 2 primary school ( 1 government primary school and 1 private primary school), and 1 junior high school. The junior high school has opened by 2012.

Health

Demographics

Transportation

Main sights

Notable people

References 
 http://biodiversityofpematanggadung.blogspot.com/

External links 

Populated places in West Kalimantan